The 1951 World Table Tennis Championships were held in Vienna from March 2 to March 11, 1951.

Medalists

Team

Individual

References

External links
ITTF Museum

 
World Table Tennis Championships
World Table Tennis Championships
World Table Tennis Championships
Table tennis competitions in Austria
International sports competitions hosted by Austria
World Table Tennis Championships, 1951
World Table Tennis Championships
Sports competitions in Vienna